Ezio Moreno Gianola (born on 13 June 1960 in Lecco) is a former Italian Grand Prix motorcycle road racer. His best year was in 1988 when he won two races in the 125 class, finishing the season in second place behind Jorge Martínez. Gianola won four races in the 1992 season, but only managed to finish the 125 championship in fourth place. He ended his career with 9 Grands Prix victories.

References 

1960 births
Living people
People from Lecco
Italian motorcycle racers
125cc World Championship riders